Sir Kingsley William Amis  (16 April 1922 – 22 October 1995) was an English novelist, poet, critic, and teacher. He wrote more than 20 novels, six volumes of poetry, a memoir, short stories, radio and television scripts, and works of social and literary criticism. He is best known for satirical comedies such as Lucky Jim (1954), One Fat Englishman (1963), Ending Up (1974), Jake's Thing (1978) and The Old Devils (1986). His biographer Zachary Leader called Amis "the finest English comic novelist of the second half of the twentieth century." He is the father of the novelist Martin Amis. In 2008, The Times ranked him ninth on a list of the 50 greatest British writers since 1945.

Life and career
Kingsley Amis was born on 16 April 1922 in Clapham, south London, the only child of William Robert Amis (1889–1963), a clerk for the mustard manufacturer Colman's in the City of London, and his wife Rosa Annie (née Lucas). The Amis grandparents were wealthy. William Amis's father, the glass merchant Joseph James Amis, owned a mansion called Barchester at Purley, then part of Surrey. Amis considered J. J. Amis – always called "Pater" or "Dadda" – "a jokey, excitable, silly little man," whom he "disliked and was repelled by". His wife Julia "was a large, dreadful, hairy-faced creature... whom [Amis] loathed and feared. His mother's parents (her father an enthusiastic collector of books employed at a gentleman's outfitters, being "the only grandparent [Amis] cared for") lived at Camberwell. Amis hoped to inherit much of his grandfather's library, but he was only permitted by his grandmother to take five volumes, on condition he wrote "from his grandfather's collection" on the flyleaf of each.

Amis was raised at Norbury – in his later estimation "not really a place, it's an expression on a map [–] really I should say I came from Norbury station." In 1940, the Amises moved to Berkhamsted, Hertfordshire. He was educated at the City of London School (as his father had been) on a scholarship, after his first year, and in April 1941 was admitted to St John's College, Oxford, also on a scholarship, where he read English. It was there he met Philip Larkin, with whom he formed the most important friendship of his life. While at Oxford in June 1941, Amis joined the Communist Party of Great Britain, although he broke with communism in 1956, in view of Soviet leader Nikita Khrushchev's denunciation of Joseph Stalin in his speech On the Cult of Personality and Its Consequences. In July 1942, he was called up for national service and served in the Royal Corps of Signals. He returned to Oxford in October 1945 to complete his degree. Although he worked hard and earned a first in English in 1947, he had decided by then to give much of his time to writing.

In 1946 he met Hilary Bardwell. They married in 1948 after she became pregnant with their first child, Philip. Amis initially arranged for her to have a back-street abortion, but changed his mind, fearing for her safety. He was a lecturer in English at the University College of Swansea from 1949 to 1961. Two other children followed: Martin in August 1949 and Sally in January 1954.

Days after Sally's birth, Amis's first novel, Lucky Jim, was published to great acclaim. Critics felt it had caught the flavour of Britain in the 1950s and ushered in a new style of fiction. By 1972, its impressive sales in Britain had been matched by 1.25 million paperback copies sold in the United States. It was translated into 20 languages, including Polish, Hebrew, Korean, and Serbo-Croat. The novel won the Somerset Maugham Award for fiction and Amis became one of the writers known as the Angry Young Men. Lucky Jim was among the first British campus novels, setting a precedent for later generations of writers such as Malcolm Bradbury, David Lodge, Tom Sharpe and Howard Jacobson. As a poet, Amis was associated with The Movement.

In 1958–1959 Amis made the first of two visits to the United States, as visiting fellow in creative writing at Princeton University and a visiting lecturer in other north-eastern universities. On returning to Britain, he fell into a rut, and he began looking for another post. After 13 years at Swansea, Amis became a fellow of Peterhouse, Cambridge in 1961, but regretted the move within a year, finding Cambridge an academic and social disappointment. He resigned in 1963, intent on moving to Majorca, although he actually moved no further than London.

In 1963, Hilary discovered that Amis was having an affair with the novelist Elizabeth Jane Howard. Hilary and Amis separated in August and he went to live with Howard, divorcing Hilary and marrying Howard in 1965. In 1968 he moved with Howard to Lemmons, a house in Barnet, north London. She and Amis divorced in 1983.

In his last years, Amis shared a house with Hilary and her third husband, Alastair Boyd, 7th Baron Kilmarnock. Martin's memoir Experience contains much about the life, charm and decline of his father.

Amis was knighted in 1990. In August 1995 he fell, suffering a suspected stroke. After apparently recovering, he worsened and died on 22 October 1995 at St Pancras Hospital, London. He was cremated and his ashes laid to rest at Golders Green Crematorium.

Literary work

Amis is widely known as a comic novelist of life in mid to late 20th-century Britain, but his literary work covered many genres – poetry, essays, criticism, short stories, food and drink, anthologies, and several novels in genres such as science fiction and mystery. His career initially developed in an inverse pattern to that of his close friend Philip Larkin's. Before becoming known as a poet, Larkin had published two novels; Amis originally sought to be a poet and turned to novels only after publishing several volumes of verse. He continued throughout his career to write poetry, in a straightforward, accessible style that often masks a nuance of thought.

Amis's first novel, Lucky Jim (1954), satirises the highbrow academic set of an unnamed university, through the eyes of a struggling young lecturer of history. It was widely perceived as part of the Angry Young Men movement of the 1950s, in reacting against stultification of conventional British life, although Amis never encouraged this interpretation. Amis's other novels of the 1950s and early 1960s likewise depict contemporary situations drawn from his own experience. That Uncertain Feeling (1955) features a young provincial librarian (perhaps with an eye to Larkin working as a librarian in Hull) and his temptation to adultery. I Like It Here (1958) takes a contemptuous view of "abroad", after Amis's own travels on the Continent with a young family. Take a Girl Like You (1960) steps away from the immediately autobiographical, but remains grounded in the concerns of sex and love in ordinary modern life, tracing the courtship and ultimate seduction of the heroine by a young schoolmaster.

With The Anti-Death League (1966), Amis begins to show some of the experimentation – in content, if not style – that marked much of his work in the 1960s and 1970s. His departure from the strict realism of his early comedic novels is not so abrupt as might first appear. He had been avidly reading science fiction since a boy and developed that interest in the Christian Gauss Lectures of 1958, while visiting Princeton University. These were published that year as New Maps of Hell: A Survey of Science Fiction, giving a serious yet light-handed treatment of what the genre had to say about man and society. Amis was especially keen on the dystopian works of Frederik Pohl and C. M. Kornbluth, and in New Maps of Hell coined the term "comic inferno" to describe a type of humorous dystopia, exemplified in the works of Robert Sheckley. He further displayed his devotion to the genre in editing, with the Sovietologist Robert Conquest, the science-fiction anthology series Spectrum I–V, which drew heavily upon 1950s numbers of the magazine Astounding Science Fiction.

Though not explicitly science fiction, The Anti-Death League takes liberties with reality not found in Amis's earlier novels. It introduces a speculative bent that continued to develop in others of his genre novels such as The Green Man (1969) (mystery/horror) and The Alteration (1976) (alternative history). Much of this speculation concerned the improbability of the existence of any benevolent deity involved in human affairs. In The Anti-Death League, The Green Man, The Alteration and elsewhere, including poems such as "The Huge Artifice: an interim assessment" and "New Approach Needed", Amis showed frustration with a God who could lace the world with cruelty and injustice, and championed the preservation of ordinary human happiness – in family, in friendships, in physical pleasure – against the demands of any cosmological scheme. Amis's religious views appear in a response, reported in his Memoirs. To the Russian poet Yevgeny Yevtushenko's question, "You atheist?" Amis replied, "It's more that I hate Him."

During this time, Amis had not turned completely away from the comedic realism of Lucky Jim and Take a Girl Like You. I Want It Now (1968) and Girl, 20 (1971) both depict the "swinging" atmosphere of London in the late 1960s, in which Amis certainly participated, though neither book is strictly autobiographical. Girl, 20, for instance, is set in the world of classical (and pop) music, in which Amis had no part. The book's noticeable command of music terminology and opinion shows Amis's amateur devotion to music and almost journalistic capacity to explore a subject that interested him. That intelligence is similarly displayed, for instance, in the ecclesiastical matters in The Alteration, for Amis was neither a Roman Catholic nor a devotee of any church.

Throughout the 1950s, 1960s, and 1970s, Amis regularly produced essays and criticism, principally for periodical publication. Some were collected in 1968 into What Became of Jane Austen? and Other Essays, in which Amis's wit and literary and social opinions were displayed on books such as Colin Wilson's The Outsider (panned), Iris Murdoch's début novel Under the Net (praised), and William Empson's Milton's God (inclined to agreement). Amis's opinions on books and people tended to appear, and often were, conservative, and yet, as the title essay of the collection shows, he was not merely reverent of "the classics" and of traditional morals, but more disposed to exercise his own rather independent judgement in all things.

Amis became associated with Ian Fleming's James Bond novels, which he admired, in the late 1960s, when he began composing critical works connected with the fictional spy, either under a pseudonym or uncredited. In 1965, he wrote the popular James Bond Dossier under his own name. That same year, he wrote The Book of Bond, or, Every Man His Own 007, a tongue-in-cheek how-to manual about being a sophisticated spy, under the pseudonym "Lt Col. William ('Bill') Tanner", Tanner being M's Chief of Staff in many of Fleming's Bond novels. In 1968 Amis wrote Colonel Sun, which was published under the pseudonym "Robert Markham".

Amis's literary style and tone changed significantly after 1970, with the possible exception of The Old Devils, a Booker Prize winner. Several critics found him old-fashioned and misogynistic. His Stanley and the Women, an exploration of social sanity, could be said to instance these traits. Others said that his output lacked the humanity, wit and compassion of earlier work.

This period also saw Amis as an anthologist, displaying a wide knowledge of all kinds of English poetry. The New Oxford Book of Light Verse (1978), which he edited, was a revision of an original volume done by W. H. Auden. Amis took it in a markedly new direction: Auden had interpreted light verse to include "low" verse of working-class or lower-class origin, regardless of subject matter, while Amis defined light verse as essentially light in tone, though not necessarily simple in composition. The Amis Anthology (1988), a personal selection of his favourite poems, grew out of his work for a London newspaper, in which he selected a poem a day and gave it a brief introduction.

Amis was shortlisted for the Booker Prize three times, for Ending Up (1974) and Jake's Thing (1978), and finally, as prizewinner, for The Old Devils in 1986.

In 2008, The Times ranked Kingsley Amis 13th on its list of the 50 greatest British writers since 1945.

Personal life

Political views
As a young man at Oxford, Amis joined the Communist Party of Great Britain and left it in 1956. He later described this stage of his political life as "the callow Marxist phase that seemed almost compulsory in Oxford." Amis remained nominally on the Left for some time after the war, declaring in the 1950s that he would always vote for the Labour Party.

Amis eventually moved further right, a development he discussed in the essay "Why Lucky Jim Turned Right" (1967); his conservatism and anti-communism can be seen in works like the dystopian novel Russian Hide and Seek (1980). In 1967, Amis, Robert Conquest, John Braine and several other authors signed a letter to The Times entitled "Backing for U.S. Policies in Vietnam", supporting the US government in the Vietnam War. He spoke at the Adam Smith Institute, arguing against government subsidy to the arts.

Character
By his own admission and according to his biographers, Amis was a serial adulterer for much of his life. This was a major contributory factor in the breakdown of his first marriage. A famous photograph of a sleeping Amis on a Yugoslav beach shows the slogan (written in lipstick by wife Hilary) on his back "1 Fat Englishman – I fuck anything."

In one memoir, Amis wrote, "Now and then I become conscious of having the reputation of being one of the great drinkers, if not one of the great drunks, of our time". He suggests this reflects a naïve tendency in readers to apply the behaviour of his characters to himself. In fact he enjoyed drink and spent a good deal of time in pubs. Hilary Rubinstein, who accepted Lucky Jim for Victor Gollancz, commented, "I doubted whether Jim Dixon would have gone to the pub and drunk ten pints of beer.... I didn't know Kingsley very well, you see." Clive James commented: "All on his own, he had the weekly drinks bill of a whole table at the Garrick Club even before he was elected. After he was, he would get so tight there that he could barely make it to the taxi." Amis was, however, adamant in his belief that inspiration did not come from a bottle: "Whatever part drink may play in the writer's life, it must play none in his or her work." This matches a disciplined approach to writing. For "many years" Amis imposed a rigorous daily schedule on himself, segregating writing and drink. Mornings were spent on writing, with a minimum daily output of 500 words. Drinking began about lunchtime, when this had been achieved. Such self-discipline was essential to Amis's prodigious output.

Yet according to James, Amis reached a turning point when his drinking ceased to be social and became a way of dulling his remorse and regret at his behaviour towards Hilly. "Amis had turned against himself deliberately.... It seems fair to guess that the troubled grandee came to disapprove of his own conduct." His friend Christopher Hitchens said: "The booze got to him in the end, and robbed him of his wit and charm as well as of his health."

Antisemitism
Amis had an unclear relationship with antisemitism, which he sometimes expressed but also disliked and opposed. He occasionally speculated on the commonly advanced Jewish stereotypes. Antisemitism was sometimes present in his conversations and letters to friends and associates, such as "The great Jewish vice is glibness, fluency ... also possibly just bullshit, as in Marx, Freud, Marcuse", or "Chaplin [who was not Jewish] is a horse's arse. He's a Jeeeew you see, like the Marx Brothers, like Danny Kaye." It is a minor theme in his Stanley and the Women novel about a paranoid schizophrenic. As for the cultural complexion of the United States, Amis had this to say: "I've finally worked out why I don't like Americans ... . Because everyone there is either a Jew or a hick." Amis himself described his antisemitism as "very mild".

Family
Amis's first, 15-year marriage was to Hilary Bardwell, the daughter of a civil servant, by whom he had two sons and one daughter: Philip Amis, a graphics designer; Martin Amis, a novelist; and Sally Amis, who died in 2000.

Amis was married a second time, to the novelist Elizabeth Jane Howard from 1965 to 1983, with whom he had no children. At the end of that marriage, he went to live with his former wife Hilary and her third husband, in a deal brokered by their two sons Philip and Martin to ensure he could be cared for until his death.

Partial bibliography

Poetry
1947 Bright November
1953 A Frame of Mind
1954 Poems: Fantasy Portraits
1956 A Case of Samples: Poems 1946–1956
1962 The Evans County
1968 A Look Round the Estate: Poems, 1957–1967
1979 Collected Poems 1944–78

Fiction
Novels
c. 1948 The Legacy (unpublished)
1954 Lucky Jim
1955 That Uncertain Feeling
1958 I Like It Here
1960 Take a Girl Like You
1963 One Fat Englishman
1965 The Egyptologists (with Robert Conquest)
1966 The Anti-Death League
1968 Colonel Sun: a James Bond Adventure (pseud. Robert Markham)
1968 I Want It Now
1969 The Green Man
1971 Girl, 20
1973 The Riverside Villas Murder
1974 Ending Up
1975 The Crime of the Century
1976 The Alteration
1978 Jake's Thing
1980 Russian Hide-and-Seek
1984 Stanley and the Women
1986 The Old Devils
1988 Difficulties with Girls
1990 The Folks That Live on the Hill
1991 We Are All Guilty
1992 The Russian Girl
1994 You Can't Do Both
1995 The Biographer's Moustache
c. 1995 Black and White (unfinished)
Short fiction collections
1962 My Enemy's Enemy
1980 Collected Short Stories
1991 Mr Barrett's Secret and Other Stories
Other short fiction
1960 "Hemingway in Space" (short story), Punch, December 1960

Non-fiction
1957 Socialism and the Intellectuals, a Fabian Society pamphlet
1960 New Maps of Hell: A Survey of Science Fiction
1965 The James Bond Dossier
1965 The Book of Bond, or Every Man His Own 007 (pseud. Lt.-Col William ('Bill') Tanner)
1970 What Became of Jane Austen?, and Other Questions
1972 On Drink
1974 Rudyard Kipling and His World
1983 Everyday Drinking
1984 How's Your Glass?
1990 The Amis Collection
1991 Memoirs
1997 The King's English: A Guide to Modern Usage (name in part a pun as he was sometimes called "Kingers" or "The King" by friends and family, as told by his son Martin in his memoir Experience)
2001 The Letters of Kingsley Amis, Edited by Zachary Leader
2008 Everyday Drinking: The Distilled Kingsley Amis, Introduction by Christopher Hitchens (an omnibus edition of On Drink, Everyday Drinking and How's Your Glass?)

Editor
1961-66 Spectrum anthology series (ed. with Robert Conquest)(Five volumes)
1978 The New Oxford Book of Light Verse (ed.)
 1981 The Golden Age of Science Fiction (ed.)

References

Sources

Kingsley Amis's Troublesome Fun, Michael Dirda. The Chronicle of Higher Education 22 June 2007. B9-B11.

External links

"Kingsley Amis in the Great Tradition and in Our Time," by Robert H. Bell, Williams College. Introduction to Critical Essays on Kingsley Amis, ed. Robert H. Bell, New York: G.K. Hall, 1998.
Guardian Books "Author Page", with profile and links to further articles.

"The Serious Comedian", by Tom Chatfield, Prospect, a review of Zachary Leader's biography.
"The old devil" – article on Amis by Mark Steyn in The New Criterion
The Amis Inheritance—Profile on Martin and Kingsley Amis by Charles McGrath from New York Times Magazine (22 April 2007).
Kingsley Amis Collection  at the Harry Ransom Center at the University of Texas at Austin.
Kingsley Amis Literary Estate

1922 births
1995 deaths
20th-century British historians
20th-century British non-fiction writers
20th-century British novelists
20th-century British poets
20th-century British short story writers
20th-century English historians
20th-century English memoirists
20th-century English non-fiction writers
20th-century English novelists
20th-century English poets
20th-century essayists
20th-century letter writers
20th-century memoirists
20th-century pseudonymous writers
Academics of Swansea University
Alumni of St John's College, Oxford
Kingsley
Anthologists
Booker Prize winners
British anti-communists
British Army personnel of World War II
British humorists
British letter writers
British literary historians
British male novelists
British male poets
British male short story writers
British memoirists
British political writers
British radio writers
British satirists
British science fiction writers
British social commentators
British speculative fiction critics
British speculative fiction editors
British spy fiction writers
British television writers
Commanders of the Order of the British Empire
Communist Party of Great Britain members
English humorists
English letter writers
English literary historians
English male novelists
English male poets
English political writers
English radio writers
English satirists
English science fiction writers
English short story writers
English social commentators
English spy fiction writers
English television writers
Former Marxists
Fellows of Peterhouse, Cambridge
Golders Green Crematorium
Knights Bachelor
Literacy and society theorists
British literary critics
Literary theorists
Members of the Fabian Society
Military personnel from London
Pamphleteers
People educated at the City of London School
People from Clapham
Royal Corps of Signals soldiers
Schoolteachers from London
Science fiction critics
Writers about activism and social change
Writers about communism
Writers from London